Winter Springs High School, is a high school in Winter Springs, Florida. It was founded in 1997 as the seventh full-time high school in Seminole County. The school is operated by Seminole County Public Schools.

History
Winter Springs High School opened in 1997 as the latest high school of Seminole County. Plans for the new school began three years earlier as a result of overcrowding at Oviedo, Lake Howell and Lyman high schools. The community of Winter Springs successfully lobbied to have the school built in their town as a way of creating a "town identity and center, and not just be an outgrowth of the surrounding cities."

Although, the school first opened in 1997 as Winter Springs High School, the school had first opened its doors as a temporary home to the student body, faculty and staff of nearby Lake Howell High School the previous year while the Lake Howell campus underwent major renovations.

A.W. Epps was the school's first principal. When the school opened in 1997, it housed only 9th and 10th grade students. The school housed grades 9–11 in 1998–1999, and the first class graduated in 1999–2000. Dr. Elise Gruber became principal in 2000 and was succeeded by Dr. Michael R. Blasewitz in 2004. In 2012 Dr. Blasewitz was named Director of High Schools of Seminole County Public Schools. As a result, Dr. Mickey Reynolds was named the fourth principal of Winter Springs High School the same year. Pete Gaffney became the principal starting in the 2017–2018 school year. The school's bell schedule has been adjusted to a modified block format, to accommodate student needs.

Sports
Winter Springs High School sponsors many interscholastic sports teams including football, cross country, volleyball, golf, bowling, track and field, lacrosse, wrestling, swimming, water polo, bowling, baseball, basketball, soccer, weightlifting, cheerleading, softball and tennis. The Winter Springs teams compete at the A.W. Epps Sports Complex, named after the high school's first principal.  

The Girls' Basketball team won state championships back-to-back in 1999 and 2000 under head coach Betsy Hughes.  Hughes led the team to the state finals in 2001, and the final four in 2002.

Coach Ocky Clarks' Girls Cross Country team won the State title in 1999.  Clarks teams won the Girls Cross Country 2019 Conference, District, Regional and State Championships. 

The volleyball team captured the 2015 FHSAA State Championship.

The Softball team went 31–0 in 2019 capturing the FHSAA State Title while being named National Champions led by Coach Mark Huaman.

The Wrestling team has set school records capturing 11 consecutive FHSAA District Championships, 5 consecutive FHSAA Region Championships and 8 consecutive SAC Conference Championships.  They also recorded ten straight top 10 state finishes with 6 top five state finishes over the past 10 years.

Band
In April 2011, the Band of Gold was invited to perform at Stetson University's prestigious band invitational, performing a repertoire that included the finale of Symphony No. 3 (Saint-Saëns). The Band of Gold traveled to Washington, D.C. in January 2009 for the inauguration of President Obama, as well as performing at the President's Park in Williamsburg, Virginia. The band recently went to the University of South Florida to participate in the 2012 Florida Bandmaster's Association State Music Performance Assessment, performing a program of March Grandioso, Armand Russell's Theme and Fantasia, and the Overture to Tannhauser. The band received straight superior ratings.

At the beginning of the 2015–2016 school year the Lord Mayor of London England asked the band program to perform at the London New Year's Day parade. "It will be lit" said Adam McIntyre, the band director for the school

Chorus
The Winter Springs High School Chorus program includes the Combined Women's (which includes the beginner, intermediate, and advanced women), Men's, Mixed Concert (which includes the men and advanced women), and Advanced Women's choirs.

National prominence
In 2004, Winter Springs High School gained national attention for its excellent Safe-School Ambassador program and was featured in a segment on MSNBC.
In 2005, Winter Springs High School gained national attention yet again when several Winter Springs students, riding in a limousine to prom, stopped a drunk driver and called the police. This story gained national headlines, and the students were featured on several national talk shows as well as NBC, CBS, and ABC. 
In 2005, the school was recognized as having the second largest number of National Merit semifinalists (19) in the state of Florida. The story was featured on the front page of the Orlando Sentinel.

Notable people
 Caskey, rapper
 Ocky Clark, track and field Olympian coaches at Winter Springs.

References

External links 
Seminole County Public Schools - WSHS
School Advisory Council report on Winter Springs (PDF)

Seminole County Public Schools
Educational institutions established in 1997
High schools in Seminole County, Florida
Public high schools in Florida
1997 establishments in Florida